The 1992 PSA Men's World Open Squash Championship is the men's edition of the 1992 World Open, which serves as the individual world championship for squash players. The event took place in Johannesburg in South Africa from 21 September to 26 September 1992. Jansher Khan won his fourth World Open title, defeating Chris Dittmar in the final.

Seeds

Draw and results

See also
PSA World Open
1992 Women's World Open Squash Championship

References

External links
World Squash History

World Squash Championships
M
1992 in South African sport
Sports competitions in Johannesburg
Squash tournaments in South Africa
International sports competitions hosted by South Africa
September 1992 sports events in Africa
1990s in Johannesburg